Kampton Kam is an athlete from Singapore specialising in the high jump. He holds the national high jump records for the U18 (2.10m), U20 (2.15m), U23 (2.20m), and men's indoor (2.08m). He is currently second on the all-time list in the men’s high jump in Singapore.

Education 
Kam is an alumnus of Victoria School and Victoria Junior College. In 2018, he was awarded The Straits Times - Young Star of the Month, an award backed by 100PLUS to outstanding school athletes. The following year, he received the Singapore Olympic-Foundation Peter Lim Scholarship. He was also named the Singapore Schools Sports Council Best Sportsboy of the year for Track and Field in 2019 and 2020.  In 2022, he enrolled in the Wharton School of the University of Pennsylvania.

High jump career 

Kam set his U-18 record at the 2018 ASEAN School Games, where he won the gold. The U-20 record was set at the 2019 National School Games, where he defended his title and became the first local schoolboy to clear 7 feet in the high jump. 

Kam competed at the Youth Olympic Games Asia Area Qualification and placed 5th with a personal best then of 2.05m, qualifying him for the 2018 Youth Olympic Games. In the first round, he finished 6th with a 2.05m effort. In the second round, he cleared 2.07m for a combined height of 4.12m to finish 7th. He also competed at the Asian Athletics Championship 2019 in Doha, Qatar, 2019 Southeast Asian Games in New Clark City, Philippines and Taiwan Athletics Open 2019.

Internationally, Kam was ranked 16th and 29th in the world in the 2018 and 2019 season as a youth (U18) and junior (U20) athlete respectively.

Kam first set the national indoor mark in Sweden in 2021 with a jump of 2.05m. In January 2023, he rewrote the record twice, jumping 2.06m at the Penn 10 Team-Select in New York, and 2.08m at the Wesley Brown Invitational in Maryland.

References

Singaporean male high jumpers
2001 births
Living people
Victoria School, Singapore alumni
Victoria Junior College alumni
Athletes (track and field) at the 2018 Summer Youth Olympics
Athletes (track and field) at the 2022 Commonwealth Games
Southeast Asian Games competitors for Singapore
Competitors at the 2019 Southeast Asian Games